Julián Serrano is a Spanish chef who lives and works in the United States. He first gained attention in San Francisco and is now most active in Las Vegas.

Biography
Born in Madrid, he studied in Marbella.

He worked in several restaurants, Caribbean cruise liners, Nashville and San Francisco before being hired at Masa's.

He is executive chef of the restaurant  Picasso in Las Vegas.

Serrano also has a restaurant at Aria named after him serving tapas and other Spanish food, as well as molecular gastronomy. It was noted as one of Esquire Magazine's "20 Best New Restaurants in 2010". In April 2015, he opened Lago at the Bellagio.

Serrano is a two-time winner of the James Beard Foundation Award (Best Chef Pacific 1998 & Best Chef Southwest 2002).

A native of Madrid, Serrano is a graduate of the Escuela Gastronomie P.P.O. hotel management school in Marbella, Spain. He has spent time at Lucas-Carlton in Paris, Hotel de France in Auch, France, Chez Max in Zurich and L’Aubergine in Munich.

Following brief positions in Miami and Nashville, Serrano moved to San Francisco, where in 1983 he helped open Masa's restaurant under the personal tutelage of the restaurant's founding chef, Masataka Kobayashi.

In 1998, Serrano brought his Mediterranean-French cooking to Bellagio in Las Vegas as Executive Chef of Picasso. The Michelin two-star restaurant has won the AAA Five Diamond Award every year since 2002 and its wine list has received the coveted Grand Award from Wine Spectator magazine.

In 2010, Esquire magazine named the restaurant Julian Serrano one of its Best New Restaurants of the year. The restaurant also received the Best of Award of Excellence from Wine Spectator Magazine in 2011.

Restaurants
Julian Serrano Tapas, Las Vegas, Nevada
LAGO, Las Vegas, Nevada
Picasso, Las Vegas, Nevada

References

External links
 Official Website of Chef Julian Serrano
 Julian Serrano - Interview and picture

People from Madrid
American chefs
American male chefs
Living people
Year of birth missing (living people)
James Beard Foundation Award winners